Ivanhoe is a  very small township on the Cobb Highway between the Lachlan and Darling rivers in New South Wales, Australia.   It is located within the Central Darling Shire local government area.   Ivanhoe functions as a service centre for the surrounding area.   The township is characterised by a particularly wide main street. At the 2016 census, Ivanhoe had a population of 196 people.

The town was founded in the early 1870s, and was named after Sir Walter Scott's work of historical fiction, Ivanhoe.   The township was situated on well-used coach and stock routes connecting Wilcannia on the Darling River with Balranald on the Murrumbidgee and Booligal on the Lachlan.

History

Ivanhoe was on the western boundary of the Wangaibon people. In 1869 George Brown Williamson, the postmaster and a storekeeper at Booligal, purchased  from the "Waiko" pastoral run at the site which was to become the township of Ivanhoe.   Williamson selected the location as a business opportunity, being the junction of two roads from Booligal and Balranald leading to Wilcannia on the Darling River.   Williamson began operating a branch store at the location under the charge of his employee Charles Hiller.   George Williamson was a native of Morayshire in Scotland, and is believed to have chosen the name ‘Ivanhoe’.   Initially the nearest water supply to Ivanhoe was at Kilfera Lake, 25 kilometres away, from which drinking water had to be carted by dray.

A hotel was built at Ivanhoe in 1871 (the Ivanhoe Hotel); the licensee was James Eade, who remained publican until 1875 (apart from during 1873 when Joshua Smith held the license).   A post office opened at Ivanhoe on 1 January 1874 at Williamson's store (renamed ‘The Post Office Store’), with Charles Hiller in charge (though Williamson was the designated Postmaster).   On 1 February 1876, after a ten-year stint at Booligal, George Williamson moved to Ivanhoe.  In 1876 two new hotels opened at Ivanhoe: the Horse and Jockey (licensee, Duncan McGregor) and Mac's Ivanhoe Hotel (licensee, Henry Gayson).   The licensee of the Ivanhoe Hotel in 1876 was Roberick MacKenzie.  In 1879 a police presence was maintained at Ivanhoe to protect local residents from the Hatfield Bushrangers.

The Ivanhoe Hotel ceased operating from 1882, leaving two hotels in the township.   During 1882 work commenced on the erection of a telegraph line from Booligal to Wilcannia.   A telegraph station was opened at Ivanhoe on 5 February 1883 under the charge of Alfred Webber Rice, who had been promoted from his position at Campbelltown.   The township was described in 1883  as having about 50 residents, a blacksmith's shop, two hotels, two stores (Williamson's and Stewart's), and "a few cottages".   By 1884 Ivanhoe was a major change-station for Cobb & Co's horses on the coach routes to and from the Darling River.   In 1884 businesses in the township included the Cobb & Co Chaff House and Millie's Stable and Yards (Henry Thomas Millie was the licensee of Mac's Ivanhoe Hotel at that time).   The mounted police were established at Ivanhoe in 1885.   The Ivanhoe Jockey Club held its first race meeting in May 1885.   From 1887 race meetings were held twice a year (until the late 1930s) on a course which formed part of the town common.   In 1889 a school opened in the township.  The summer heat was a significant problem for the school.  Refrigerating paint and a veranda were used to ward off the sun but the school was closed during the extended drought of 1904 to 1907.
    
Ivanhoe was officially proclaimed a township in 1890.  A new Post Office building was constructed, which opened in January 1898.   The Ivanhoe Post Office building, though it has been renovated in recent years, still stands adjacent to its original site.

The founder of Ivanhoe, George Williamson, died in 1907.

In 1925 Ivanhoe was linked by the Broken Hill railway line to Sydney via Parkes. Two years later the extension to Broken Hill was completed. The line through Ivanhoe later became part of the transcontinental east-west rail corridor connecting Sydney to Perth.

Ivanhoe Heritage Trail
The Ivanhoe Heritage Trail provides a good introduction to the town and its history.   At separate sign-posted locations along the trail there are detailed descriptions of (1) the arrival of the railway (2) the Government Tank (3) the Post Office (4) bushrangers (5) watering holes (6) industrial trouble (7) the Cobb Highway and (8) reminiscences.   With the exception of the railway station all sites are located within a block of the main street.   A pamphlet with details of the heritage trail is available from the post office and other retail outlets; a book with more detailed information is also available for purchase.

Climate
Ivanhoe has a hot semi-arid climate (BSh) under the Köppen climate classification, featuring very hot, dry summers and short, mild winters.

Ivanhoe Health Service
Ivanhoe Health Service caters to the general Ivanhoe population, as well as to outlying sheep and cattle stations. 

The health service is part of the New South Wales Far West Local Health District, and its staff consist of full-time registered nurses, Aboriginal health workers and support staff. 

The health service provides a 24-hour accident and emergency service, and features a state-of-the-art 4x4 ambulance.  Patients requiring further treatment are evacuated to Broken Hill Health Service or other specialist healthcare providers throughout New South Wales, Victoria and South Australia, by a variety of healthcare services including the Royal Flying Doctor Service. 

Medical services are provided twice a week by the Royal Flying Doctor Service with specialisations including ophthalmology, dental, child health, endocrinology, dermatology, and physiotherapy. Maari Ma Health Aboriginal Corporation also provides a chronic disease GP who visits the clinic every 6 weeks. 

The staff rosters are all day shifts from Monday to Friday, 8.30am – 5.00pm, with RNs rostered on call.  

In 2012 the hospital was upgraded with a new emergency department which was built onto the existing structure.  The total cost of the upgrade totalled $590,000.  The upgrade included a two-bay treatment and resuscitation area and a new ambulance bay which connected to the hospital.

In December 2015 the hospital was further upgraded with the development of the Ivanhoe HealthOne facility,  which is situated in front of the existing health facility and is connected to the 2012 emergency department.  The cost of the new facility totalled $2.4 million.  The upgrade included a new waiting area, administration offices, three treatment rooms, and featured four 'story poles' in front of the facility's entrance that were carved by inmates from the Ivanhoe Warakirri Correctional Centre.

Ivanhoe Warakirri Centre 
(Now Closed by Gladys Berejiklian Government of NSW), Ivanhoe Warakirri Centre is a minimum security correctional centre for male inmates, located at Ivanhoe.   The Centre has accommodation for 55 prisoners, the majority of whom are Aboriginal.   Inmates perform cleaning and maintenance tasks, as well as participating in community projects and the Mobile Outreach program.   Inmates also undertake education programs, including numeracy and literacy, and self-awareness and alcohol- and substance-abuse management programs.

Since June 2020 the Correctional centre was closed by the Gladys Berejiklian Government of NSW (libs/country party) the facility and 26 houses were Sold to Tronox mining Company to help accommodate some of its staff for the Atlas/campaspe mine 140 klms south west of Ivanhoe on the Balranald - Ivanhoe road, where they mine mineralised sand. The heavy mineral concentrate from the mine (HMC) will be trucked to a new rail siding just outside of town, then transported to Broken Hill for further processing.
The rail load-out facility (the Ivanhoe Rail Facility), is located 140 km north-east of the mine and 4.5 km south-west of Ivanhoe, in the Central Darling LGA. Ivanhoe will be an important logistics hub for Atlas-Campaspe, and there will be employment and business opportunities through their contractors during the construction and operational phases.

Sports teams
The township of Ivanhoe is represented by rugby league team the Ivanhoe Roosters who play in the Group 17 Rugby League competition.

Railway

Ivanhoe railway station opened on 19 August 1925 and is located on the Broken Hill railway line. The station is now unattended but it is still served by NSW TrainLink's Outback Xplorer on Mondays (heading to Broken Hill) and Tuesdays (heading to Sydney). The Indian Pacific passes through to Sydney on Tuesdays, and to Adelaide and Perth on Thursdays but does not stop.

The main town is located approximately three kilometres north of the railway station and from the original opening of the line a separate suburb was constructed by the railways adjacent the station to service the railways needs. This locality was generally referred to as a railway town. Workshops, worker houses, locomotive depots, track maintenance depot, crew barracks, fuelling point and the station were all located in rail town. Twenty-three new houses were built as recently as 1979 by the NSW Housing Commission. Rail town has now largely been taken over by the Ivanhoe (Warakirri) Correctional Centre.

Ivanhoe remains a train crossing location where two trains can meet and pass one another on a 1,850 metre long section of double railway track, 816 rail kilometres from Sydney. Ivanhoe train crossing loop is between the adjacent crossing locations of Trida (65 km to the east) and Darnick (64 km to the west).

Police and emergency services
Ivanhoe has a police station which is usually staffed by two officers, Andrew and Jim (2022). It has a Rural Fire Service (RFS) mainly staffed by volunteers over the age of 60. Ivanhoe has a unit of the State Emergency Service (SES) who are accredited for Road Crash Rescue (RCR) among other tasks. NSW SES can be contacted on 132 500 24hrs / 7 days a week, call centre.

Road routes
Ivanhoe is located on the Cobb Highway, National Route 75, which runs generally north–south between Moama and Wilcannia. Ivanhoe is 182 km from Wilcannia to the north and 210 km from Hay to the south. There is a local road from Ivanhoe to Menindee, 205 km in length; this road is a gravel, dry-weather only road. The Cobb Highway is almost a fully tarred road, with only 15 km of dirt road remaining just north of Mount Manara, which is about 60 km north of Ivanhoe. The Cobb Highway between Ivanhoe and Wilcannia is a far better road than the Cobb Highway south of Ivanhoe. In November 2022 major flooding just south of Mossgiel closed the Cobb Highway for weeks; the only open road into Ivanhoe was via the Balranald road, with minor flooding around the Killfera farm.

References

External links

"Ivanhoe profile", PM (Reporter: David Spicer), ABC Radio, 24 June 1999.
"Guide and Information to Ivanhoe", Murray Outback, archived 7 January 2009.

Far West (New South Wales)
Railway towns